Boniface Sunday Emerengwa (born 1959 in Rivers State) is a Nigerian lawyer and People's Democratic Party politician. He represents Ikwerre-Emohua constituency in the House of Representatives of Nigeria, a post he was elected to in March 2015. Emerengwa has served as Rivers State Budget and Economic Planning Commissioner. He is also a former Chairman of Ikwerre local government area in the state.

See also
List of people from Rivers State

References

Living people
Commissioners of ministries of Rivers State
Rivers State Peoples Democratic Party politicians
Mayors of places in Rivers State
People from Ikwerre (local government area)
Members of the House of Representatives (Nigeria) from Rivers State
Date of birth missing (living people)
Rivers State lawyers
Peoples Democratic Party members of the House of Representatives (Nigeria)
1959 births